This list of zoos, animal parks, safari parks, wildlife parks, bird parks, aquariums, wildlife sanctuaries and nature reserves where visitors are allowed  in the Czech Republic is sorted by location.

See also
List of zoos by country
European Association of Zoos and Aquaria - EAZA
World Association of Zoos and Aquariums - WAZA
International Zoo Educators Association - IZE
Species360 - ISIS
International Union for Conservation of Nature - IUCN
Botanic Gardens Conservation International - BGCI
Union of Czech and Slovak Zoological Gardens - UCSZOO

Sources
The 2017 Annual Report of UCSZOO  - The Union of Czech and Slovak Zoos

References

External links
www.zoo.cz UCSZOO

 
Czech Republic
Zoos